Eugenio Lazzarini (born 26 March 1945) is an Italian former Grand Prix motorcycle road racing World Champion.

Lazzarini began his Grand Prix career in 1969 in the 250 class on a Benelli. He won his first Grand Prix at the 1973 Dutch TT on a Maico. He captured the FIM 1978 125cc world championship riding an MBA. He followed that up with two 50cc world championships in 1979 and 1980 riding a Kreidler. His riding career spanned 15 seasons.

Complete Grand Prix motorcycle racing results 

Points system from 1969 onwards:

(key) (Races in bold indicate pole position; races in italics indicate fastest lap)

References 

Italian motorcycle racers
50cc World Championship riders
125cc World Championship riders
250cc World Championship riders
1945 births
Living people
125cc World Riders' Champions